Sthanu Ravi Varma (early Malayalam and Tamil: Ko Tanu Iravi), known as the Kulasekhara, was the Chera Perumal ruler of Kerala in southern India from 844/45 to 870/71 AD. He is the earliest Chera Perumal ruler known to scholars.

The Chera Perumal relations with the Chola dynasty were inaugurated during the reign of Sthanu Ravi. The famous Quilon Syrian Christian copper plates are dated in the fifth regnal year of king Sthanu Ravi. Two more inscriptions dated in the regnal years of Sthanu Ravi can be found at Irinjalakuda Kudalmanikyam Temple, and at Thiruvatruvay, Thiruvalla. Koyil Adhikarikal (the Royal Prince) during the time of Sthanu Ravi was his son-in-law (husband of his daughter) Vijayaraga. Sthanu Ravi had a son born to him in or about 870 AD. He was succeeded by Rama Rajasekhara (870/71–c. 883/84).

Sthanu Ravi probably abdicated the throne toward the end of his reign and became a Vaishnavite alvar saint known as Kulasekhara Alvar (seventh of the twelve mystic alvars). He is also identified with playwright Chera king Kulasekhara Varma.

Career 

Present-day central Kerala probably detached from Kongu Chera or Kerala kingdom (around 8th-9th century AD) to form the Chera Perumal kingdom. Central Kerala was under some form of viceregal rule prior to this period. 

The direct authority of the Chera Perumal king was restricted to the country around capital Makotai (Mahodaya, present-day Kodungallur) in central Kerala. His kingship was only ritual and remained nominal compared with the power that local chieftains (the udaiyavar) exercised politically and militarily. Nambudiri-Brahmins also possessed huge authority in religious and social subjects (the so-called ritual sovereignty combined with Brahmin oligarchy).

Chola contemporary of Sthanu Ravi 

Sthanu Ravi was a partner in the Chola king Rajakesari Varma's campaign in Kongu country (central Tamil Nadu). It is known that the two rulers jointly conferred military honours on a chief of Tanjore called Vikki Annan (who was the husband of Kadamba Mahadevi), probably a Ganga prince. Vikki Annan, son of Prithvipati, is mentioned in a Ganga inscription of the mid-9th century AD. The title "Kadamba" suggests a relationship with the Kadamba lineage. 

King Rajakesari Varma can be identified either with Aditya Chola (c. 871–907 AD) or with Srikantha Chola (817–845 AD).

 Identification of Rajakesari Varma with Aditya Chola (c. 871–907 AD) (followed Elamkulam P. N. Kunjan Pillai) – Elamkulam also assumes that Sthanu Ravi ruled up to 885 AD to be able to become the junior partner in Aditya Chola's wars in Kongu Nadu. – this view is found acceptable by the recent scholarship.
 Identification of Rajakesari Varma with Srikantha Chola (817–845 AD) – this puts the joint action in 844/45 AD and Sthanu Ravi's final regnal year in 883 AD – this view was found acceptable by M. G. S. Narayanan (following T. V. Mahalingam).

Astronomy 
An astronomer called Sankara Narayana (c. 840 – 900 AD) was a member of the royal court of Kulasekhara. Narayana is best known as the author of Laghu Bhaskariya Vyakha, a detailed commentary of on the works of mathematician Bhaskara I (early 6th century AD). 

An observatory functioned at Kodungallur under the charge of Narayana. There are references to an instrument called "Rashi Chakra" marked by a "Yanthra Valaya" in the Vyakha. This instrument might be the same as the Gola Yanthra/Chakra Yanthra mentioned by famous polymath Aryabhata. The Chakra Yanthra was developed further and called Phalaka Yanthra by Bhaskara I.

Inscriptions

As Sthanu Ravi 
Ayyan Adikal, the chieftain of Quilon (Kollam) under Sthanu Ravi, issued the famous Quilon Syrian Christian copper plates in c. 849 AD. The inscription records that Ayyan Adikal granted land and serfs to a Christian church at Quilon, built by Mar Sapir Iso, and entrusted its maintenance to trade guilds anjuvannam and manigramam. The grant was made in the presence of Chera Perumal prince Vijayaraga. Daughter of Kulasekhara, with the title Kizhan Adikal Ravi Neeli, was married to Vijayaraga (who was probably was the son of the sister of Kulasekhara also).

As Kulasekhara

Literary references 
An anonymous work called Padmapada Acharya Charita says that the protagonist who was the disciple of philosopher-theologian Sankara flourished in time of king "Kulasekhara". Vasubhatta, a famous Yamaka poet of medieval Kerala, names his patron king as "Rama". A later commentary on a poem by Vasubhatta says that "Kulasekhara" was the regnal title of king Rama. Scholars generally consider this a result of confusion on the part of the commentators (between Sthanu Ravi Kulasekhara and Rama Rajasekhara) who were separated in time from Vasubhatta. Some scholars also identify king Rama Kulasekhara as the patron of poet Vasubhatta (and thus placing Vasubhatta in 11th-12 centuries AD). This view is generally found unacceptable on several counts.

Laghu Bhaskariya Vyakha 
The opening verse of Laghu Bhaskariya Vyakha, composed in the court of Ravi Kulasekhara, gives an indirect invocation to the lord called "Sthanu" (carefully composed to be applicable to god Siva and the ruling king).

The commentary also gives the current date as Kali Era and as Saka Era.

 Anga = 6, Rtu = 6, Ambara = 0, Nanda = 9, Veda = 4, and Manu = 14
 Order - 6609414
 Reverse Order - 1449066
 Kali Date - 3967 years and 86 days = 25 Mithuna, Kollam Era 41 = 870 AD

 Candra = 1, Randhra = 9, and Muni = 7
 Order - 197
 Reverse Order - 791 (Saka Year) = 870 AD
It was on the basis of certain statements in Laghu Bhaskariya Vyakha, the date coronation of Ravi Kulasekhara was fixed at 844 AD.

 Meeting of Guru (=Jupiter) and Sauri (=Saturn) in Capa (Dhanu) = 25th regnal year of the king = 870 AD

See also 
 Rajendra Chola
 Raja Raja Chola

References 

People of the Kodungallur Chera kingdom
9th-century Indian monarchs
Kodungallur Chera kings